Lars Grini (born 29 June 1944) is a Norwegian former ski jumper who competed between 1966 and 1972.

Career 
His best-known successes were at the 1968 Winter Olympics in Grenoble, where he won a bronze medal in the individual large hill event, and another bronze medal in the individual normal hill at the 1970 FIS Nordic World Ski Championships. He represented the club SFK Lyn.

On 10 February 1967, he set ski jumping distance world record at 147 metres (482 ft) on Heini-Klopfer-Skiflugschanze in Oberstdorf, West Germany. 

On 11 February 1967, the next day, he set another world record at 150 metres (492 ft) also in Oberstdorf.

Ski jumping world records

References

External links 
 
 

1944 births
Place of birth missing (living people)
Living people
Ski jumpers at the 1968 Winter Olympics
Olympic bronze medalists for Norway
Norwegian male ski jumpers
Olympic ski jumpers of Norway
Olympic medalists in ski jumping
FIS Nordic World Ski Championships medalists in ski jumping
Medalists at the 1968 Winter Olympics
20th-century Norwegian people